This is a list of schools in Birmingham, West Midlands, England.

State-funded schools

Primary schools 

Abbey RC Primary School, Erdington
Acocks Green Primary School, Acocks Green
Adderley Primary School, Adderley Park
Al-Furqan Primary School, Tyseley
Albert Bradbeer Primary Academy, Northfield
Allens Croft Primary School, Kings Heath
Alston Primary School, Bordesley Green
Anderton Park Primary School, Sparkhill
Anglesey Primary School, Lozells
Arden Primary School, Sparkhill
Ark Kings Academy, Kings Norton
Ark Tindal Primary Academy, Balsall Heath
Ark Victoria Academy, Small Heath
Aston Tower Community Primary School, Aston
Audley Primary School, Stechford
Barford Primary School, Edgbaston
Barr View Primary Academy, Great Barr
Beeches Infant School, Perry Beeches
Beeches Junior School, Perry Beeches
Bellfield Infant School, Northfield
Bellfield Junior School, Northfield
Bells Farm Primary School, Druids Heath
Benson Community School, Hockley
Billesley Primary School, Billesley
Birches Green Infant School, Erdington
Birches Green Junior School, Erdington
Birchfield Primary School, Aston
Blakesley Hall Primary School, Yardley
Boldmere Infant School, Boldmere
Boldmere Junior School, Boldmere
Bordesley Green Primary School, Bordesley Green
Bordesley Village Primary School, Bordesley
Bournville School, Bournville
Bournville Village Primary, Bournville
Broadmeadow Infant School, Kings Norton
Broadmeadow Junior School, Kings Norton
Brookfields Primary School, Hockley
Brookvale Primary School, Stockland Green
Brownmead Primary Academy, Shard End
Calshot Primary School, Great Barr
Canterbury Cross Primary School, Birchfield
Cedars Academy, Acocks Green
Chad Vale Primary School, Edgbaston
Chandos Primary School, Highgate
Cherry Orchard Primary School, Handsworth Wood
Chilcote Primary School, Hall Green
Chilwell Croft Academy, Newtown
Chivenor Primary School, Castle Vale
Christ Church CE Primary School, Sparkbrook
Christ the King RC Primary School, Kingstanding
City Road Primary School, Rotton Park
Clifton Primary School, Balsall Heath
Cofton Primary School, West Heath
Colebourne Primary School, Hodge Hill
Colmers Farm Primary School, Longbridge
Colmore Infant School, Kings Heath
Colmore Junior School, Kings Heath
Conway Primary School, Sparkbrook
Coppice Primary School, Four Oaks
Corpus Christi RC Primary School, Stechford
Cotteridge Primary School, Cotteridge
Cottesbrooke Infant School, Acocks Green
Court Farm Primary School, Erdington
Cromwell Junior & Infant School, Nechells
The Deanery CE Primary School, Walmley
Deykin Avenue Junior & Infant School, Witton
Dorrington Academy, Perry Barr
Elms Farm Community Primary School, Sheldon
English Martyrs' RC Primary School, Springfield
Erdington Hall Primary School, Erdington
Fairway Primary Academy, Kings Norton
Featherstone Primary School, Erdington
Firs Primary School, Castle Bromwich
Forestdale Primary School, Frankley
Four Dwellings Primary Academy, Quinton
Four Oaks Primary School, Four Oaks
George Dixon Primary School, Harborne
Gilbertstone Primary School, Gilbertstone
Glenmead Primary School, Oscott
Gossey Lane Academy, Shard End
Great Barr Primary School, Great Barr
Green Meadow Primary School, Weoley
Greenholm Primary School, Oscott
Greet Primary School, Greet
Grendon Primary School, Kings Heath
Grestone Academy, Handsworth Wood
Grove School, Handsworth
Guardian Angels RC Primary School, Shard End
Gunter Primary School, Erdington
Hall Green Infant School, Hall Green
Hall Green Junior School, Hall Green
Harborne Primary School, Harborne
Harper Bell Seventh-day Adventist School, Camp Hill
Hawkesley Church Primary Academy, Kings Norton
Hawthorn Primary School, Kingstanding
Heath Mount Primary School, Balsall Heath
Heathfield Primary School, Handsworth
Heathlands Primary Academy, Castle Bromwich
Highfield Junior & Infant School, Saltley
Highters Heath Community School, Warstock
Hill West Primary School, Four Oaks
Hillstone Primary School, Shard End
Hodge Hill Primary School, Hodge Hill
Holland House Infant School, Sutton Coldfield
Holly Hill Methodist/CE Infant School, Rubery
Hollyfield Primary School, Reddicap Heath
Hollywood Primary School, Highter's Heath
Holy Cross RC Primary School, Walmley
Holy Family RC Primary School, Small Heath
Holy Souls RC Primary School, Acocks Green
Holy Trinity CE Primary Academy, Handsworth
James Watt Primary School, Soho
Jervoise School, Weoley Castle
King David Primary School, Moseley
King Solomon International Business School, Duddeston
Kings Heath Primary School, Kings Heath
Kings Norton Junior & Infant School, Kings Norton
Kings Rise Academy, Kingstanding
Kingsland Primary School, Kingstanding
Kingsthorne Primary School, Kingstanding
Kitwell Primary School, Bartley Green
Ladypool Primary School, Sparkbrook
Lakey Lane Junior & Infant School, Acocks Green
Lea Forest Primary Academy, Kitts Green
Leigh Primary School, Washwood Heath
Little Sutton Primary School, Sutton Coldfield
Lozells Junior & Infant School, Aston
Lyndon Green Infant School, Sheldon
Lyndon Green Junior School, Sheldon
Maney Hill Primary School, Maney
Manor Park Primary Academy, Aston
Mansfield Green E-ACT Academy, Aston
Mapledene Primary School, Sheldon
Marlborough Primary School, Small Heath
Marsh Hill Primary School, Stockland Green
Maryvale RC Primary School, Old Oscott
The Meadows Primary School, Longbridge
Mere Green Primary School, Mere Green
Merritts Brook Primary E-ACT Academy, Weoley
Minworth Junior & Infant School, Minworth
Montgomery Primary Academy, Sparkbrook
Moor Green Primary School, Moseley
Moor Hall Primary School, Sutton Coldfield
Moseley CE Primary School, Moseley
Nansen Primary School, Washwood Heath
Nechells Primary E-ACT Academy, Nechells
Nelson Junior & Infant School, Ladywood
Nelson Mandela School, Sparkbrook
New Hall Primary School, Sutton Coldfield
New Oscott Primary School, New Oscott
Nishkam Primary School, Handsworth
Nonsuch Primary School, Woodgate
Northfield Manor Primary Academy, Selly Oak
The Oaklands Primary School, Acocks Green
The Oaks Primary School, Druids Heath
Oasis Academy Blakenhale Infants, Garretts Green
Oasis Academy Blakenhale Junior, Garretts Green
Oasis Academy Boulton, Soho
Oasis Academy Foundry, Soho
Oasis Academy Hobmoor, Yardley
Oasis Academy Short Heath, Short Heath
Oasis Academy Woodview, Edgbaston
The Olive School Birmingham, Sparkhill
The Olive School Small Heath, Small Heath
The Oratory RC Primary School, Ladywood
The Orchards Primary Academy, Bartley Green
Osborne Primary School, Erdington
Our Lady & St Rose of Lima RC Primary School, Weoley
Our Lady of Fatima RC Primary School, Quinton
Our Lady of Lourdes RC Primary School, Yardley Wood
Our Lady's RC Primary School, Tile Cross
The Oval School, Yardley
Paganel Primary School, Selly Oak
Paget Primary School, Pype Hayes
Park Hill Primary School, Moseley
Parkfield Community School, Saltley
Pegasus Primary Academy, Castle Vale
Penns Primary School, Sutton Coldfield
Percy Shurmer Academy, Balsall Heath
Prince Albert Junior & Infant School, Aston
Princethorpe Infant School, Weoley
Princethorpe Junior School, Weoley
Quinton Church Primary School, Quinton
Raddlebarn Primary School, Selly Park
Reaside Academy, Frankley
Redhill Primary School, Hay Mills
Rednal Hill Infant School, Rednal
Rednal Hill Junior School, Rednal
Regents Park Community Primary School, Nechells
Robin Hood Academy, Hall Green
Rookery School, Handsworth
The Rosary RC Primary School, Saltley
Sacred Heart RC Primary School, Birchfield
St Alban's RC Primary School, Kings Heath
St Ambrose Barlow RC Primary School, Hall Green
St Anne's RC Primary School, Nechells
St Augustine's RC Primary School, Handsworth
St Barnabas CE Primary School, Erdington
St Benedict's Primary School, Bordesley Green
St Bernadette's RC Primary School, Yardley
St Bernard's RC Primary School, Wake Green
St Brigid's RC Primary School, Northfield
St Catherine of Siena RC Primary School, Lee Bank
St Chad's RC Primary School, Newtown
St Clare's RC Primary School, Handsworth
St Clement's CE Academy, Nechells
St Columba's RC Primary School, Rednal
St Cuthbert's RC Junior & Infant School, Stechford
St Dunstan's RC Primary School, Kings Heath
St Edmund's RC Primary School, Soho
St Edward's RC Primary School, Selly Park
St Francis CE Primary School, Bournville
St Francis RC Primary School, Handsworth
St George's CE Academy, Newtown
St George's CE Primary School, Ladywood
St Gerard's RC Junior & Infant School, Castle Vale
St James CE Primary School, Handsworth
St James RC Primary School, Rednal
St John Fisher RC Primary School, West Heath
St John's & St Peter's CE Academy, Ladywood
St John's CE Primary School, Sparkhill
St Joseph's RC Primary School, Kings Norton
St Joseph's RC Primary School, Nechells
St Joseph's RC Primary School, Sutton Coldfield
St Jude's RC Primary School, Druids Heath
St Laurence Church Infant School, Northfield
St Laurence Church Junior School, Northfield
St Margaret Mary RC Junior & Infant School, Perry Common
St Mark's RC Primary School, Great Barr
St Martin de Porres RC Primary School, Moseley
St Mary & St John Junior & Infant School, Erdington
St Mary's CE Primary Academy, Handsworth
St Mary's CE Primary School, Selly Oak
St Mary's RC Primary School, Harborne
St Matthew's CE Primary School, Duddeston
St Michael's CE Primary Academy, Handsworth
St Michael's CE Primary School, Bartley Green
St Nicholas RC Primary School, Sutton Coldfield
St Patrick's RC Primary School, Ladywood
St Paul's RC Primary School, Kings Norton
St Peter & St Paul RC Junior & Infant School, Erdington
St Peter's CE Primary School, Harborne
St Peter's RC Primary School, Bartley Green
St Saviour's CE Primary School, Saltley
St Teresa's RC Primary School, Handsworth Wood
St Thomas CE Academy, Lee Bank
St Thomas More RC Primary School, Sheldon
St Vincent's RC Primary School, Nechells
St Wilfrid's RC Junior & Infant School, Castle Bromwich
SS John and Monica RC Primary School, Moseley
Severne Junior & Infant School, Acocks Green
Shaw Hill Primary School, Alum Rock
The Shirestone Academy, Tile Cross
Slade Primary School, Erdington
Sladefield Infant School, Ward End
Somerville Primary School, Small Heath
Springfield Primary Academy, Moseley
Stanville Primary School, Sheldon
Starbank School, Small Heath
Stechford Primary School, Stechford
Stirchley Primary School, Stirchley
Story Wood School, Perry Common
Summerfield Junior & Infant School, Winson Green
Sundridge Primary School, Kingstanding
Sutton Park Primary, Sutton Coldfield
Tame Valley Academy, Castle Bromwich
Thornton Primary School, Ward End
Timberley Academy, Shard End
Tiverton Academy, Bournbrook
Topcliffe Primary School, Castle Vale
Town Junior School, Sutton Coldfield
Turves Green Primary School, Northfield
Twickenham Primary School, Kingstanding
Walmley Infant School, Walmley
Walmley Junior School, Walmley
Ward End Primary School, Ward End
Warren Farm Primary School, Kingstanding
Washwood Heath Academy, Washwood Heath
Water Mill Primary School, Selly Oak
Wattville Primary School, Handsworth
Waverley School, Small Heath
Welford Primary School, Handsworth
Welsh House Farm Community School, Quinton
West Heath Primary School, West Heath
Westminster Primary School, Handsworth
Wheelers Lane Primary School, Kings Heath
Whitehouse Common Primary School, Whitehouse Common
William Murdoch Primary School, Handsworth
Woodcock Hill Primary School, Northfield
Woodgate Primary School, Bartley Green
Woodhouse Primary Academy, Quinton
Woodthorpe Junior & Infant School, Kings Heath
World's End Infant School, Quinton
World's End Junior School, Quinton
Wychall Primary School, Northfield
Wylde Green Primary School, Wylde Green
Wyndcliffe Primary School, Bordesley Green
Yardley Primary School, Yardley
Yardley Wood Community Primary School, Yardley Wood
Yarnfield Primary School, Tyseley
Yenton Primary School, Erdington
Yew Tree Community Junior & Infant School, Aston
Yorkmead Junior & Infant School, Hall Green

Non-selective secondary schools 

Archbishop Ilsley RC School, Acocks Green
Arena Academy, Great Barr
Ark Boulton Academy, Sparkhill
Ark Kings Academy, Kings Norton
Ark St Alban's Academy, Highgate
Ark Victoria Academy, Small Heath
The Arthur Terry School, Four Oaks, Sutton Coldfield
Aston Manor Academy, Aston
Aston University Engineering Academy, Gosta Green
Bartley Green School, Bartley Green
Birmingham Ormiston Academy, Birmingham City Centre
Bishop Challoner RC College, Kings Heath
Bishop Walsh RC School, Sutton Coldfield
BOA Digital Technologies Academy, Nechells
Bordesley Green Girls' School, Bordesley Green
Bournville School, Bournville
Broadway Academy, Perry Barr
Cardinal Wiseman RC School, Kingstanding
Christ Church CE Secondary Academy, Yardley Wood
City Academy, Ladywood
Cockshut Hill School, Yardley
Colmers School, Rednal
Dame Elizabeth Cadbury School, Bournville
Eden Boys' Leadership Academy, Aston
Eden Boys' School, Perry Barr
Eden Girls' Leadership Academy, Balsall Heath
Erdington Academy, Erdington
Fairfax Academy, Sutton Coldfield
Fortis Academy, Great Barr
Four Dwellings Academy, Quinton
George Dixon Academy, Harborne
Greenwood Academy, Castle Vale
Hall Green School, Hall Green
Hamstead Hall Academy, Handsworth Wood
Harborne Academy, Edgbaston
Heartlands Academy, Nechells
Hillcrest School, Bartley Green
Hodge Hill College, Hodge Hill
Hodge Hill Girls' School, Hodge Hill
Holte School, Lozells
Holy Trinity RC School, Small Heath
Holyhead School, Handsworth
Jewellery Quarter Academy, Birmingham City Centre
John Willmott School, Sutton Coldfield
King Edward VI Balaam Wood Academy, Frankley
King Edward VI Handsworth Wood Girls' Academy, Handsworth Wood
King Edward VI Northfield School for Girls, Northfield
King Edward VI Sheldon Heath Academy, Sheldon
King Solomon International Business School, Duddeston
Kings Heath Boys, Kings Heath
King's Norton Boys' School, Kings Norton
Kings Norton Girls' School, Kings Norton
Lordswood Boys' School, Harborne
Lordswood Girls' School, Harborne
Moseley School, Moseley
Ninestiles Academy, Acocks Green
Nishkam High School, Lozells
North Birmingham Academy, Erdington
Plantsbrook School, Sutton Coldfield
Prince Albert High School, Perry Barr
Queensbridge School, Moseley
Rockwood Academy, Alum Rock
St Edmund Campion RC School, Erdington
St John Wall RC School, Handsworth
St Paul's School for Girls, Edgbaston
St Thomas Aquinas RC School, Kings Norton
Saltley Academy, Bordesley Green
Selly Park Girls' School, Selly Park
Shenley Academy, Northfield
Small Heath Leadership Academy, Small Heath
Starbank School, Small Heath
Stockland Green School, Stockland Green
Swanshurst School, Billesley
Tile Cross Academy, Tile Cross
Turves Green Boys' School, Northfield
University of Birmingham School, Selly Oak
Washwood Heath Academy, Washwood Heath
Waverley School, Small Heath
Waverley Studio College, Bordesley Green
Wheelers Lane Technology College, Kings Heath
Yardleys School, Tyseley

Grammar schools 

Bishop Vesey's Grammar School, Sutton Coldfield
King Edward VI Aston School, Aston
King Edward VI Camp Hill School for Boys, Kings Heath
King Edward VI Camp Hill School for Girls, Kings Heath
King Edward VI Five Ways School, Bartley Green
King Edward VI Handsworth Grammar School for Boys, Handsworth
King Edward VI Handsworth School, Handsworth
Sutton Coldfield Grammar School for Girls, Sutton Coldfield

Special and alternative schools 

Baskerville School, Harborne
Beaufort School, Hodge Hill
Braidwood School for The Deaf, Hodge Hill
Brays School, Stechford
The Bridge School, Erdington
Calthorpe Academy, Highgate
Cherry Oak School, Selly Oak
City of Birmingham School, Frankley
The Dame Ellen Pinsent School, Kings Heath
East Birmingham Network Academy, Yardley
EBN Academy, Erdington
The Edge Academy, Northfield
Fox Hollies School, Moseley
Hallmoor School, Kitts Green
Hamilton School, Handsworth
James Brindley School, Ladywood
Langley School, Four Oaks
Lea Hall Academy, Lea Hall
Leycroft Academy, Tile Cross
Lindsworth School, Kings Norton
Longwill School for the Deaf, Northfield
Mayfield School, Handsworth
Oscott Manor School, Old Oscott
The Pines Special School, Castle Bromwich
Priestley Smith School, Great Barr
Queensbury School, Erdington
Reach School, Kings Heath
Selly Oak Trust School, Selly Oak
Springfield House Community Special School, Knowle, Solihull*
Titan Aston Academy, Aston
Titan St George's Academy, Hockley
Uffculme School, Moseley
Victoria School, Northfield
Wilson Stuart School, Erdington

*This school is located in the Borough of Solihill, but is for pupils from Birmingham.

Further education

Access Creative College
Birmingham Metropolitan College
BOA Stage and Screen Production Academy
Bournville College
Cadbury Sixth Form College
Fircroft College
Joseph Chamberlain Sixth Form College
The National College for Advanced Transport and Infrastructure
South & City College Birmingham

Independent schools

Primary and preparatory schools

Al-Ameen Primary School, Tyseley
Birmingham Blue Coat School, Edgbaston
Greenfields Primary School, Small Heath
Hallfield School, Edgbaston
The Lambs Christian School, Hockley
Norfolk House School, Edgbaston
Rosslyn School, Hall Green
The Shrubbery School, Walmley
West House School, Edgbaston
The Wisdom Academy, Nechells

Senior and all-through schools

Al-Burhan Grammar School, Tyseley
Al Huda Girls' School, Saltley
Birchfield Independent Girls' School, Birchfield
Darul Uloom Islamic High School, Small Heath
Edgbaston High School, Edgbaston
Elmhurst Ballet School, Edgbaston
Green Oak Academy, Moseley
Hamd House School, Bordesley Green
Hazrat Khadijatul Kubra Girls School, Small Heath
Heritage Academy, Sparkbrook
Highclare School, Erdington
Jamia Islamia Birmingham, Sparkbrook
Kimichi School, Acocks Green
King Edward VI High School for Girls, Edgbaston
King Edward's School, Edgbaston
Mander Portman Woodward, Edgbaston
Priory School, Edgbaston
Redstone Academy for Boys, Balsall Heath
Redstone Academy for Girls, Balsall Heath
St George's School, Edgbaston

Special and alternative schools

Arc Oakbridge School, Newtown
Asprire AP School, Hall Green
Birmingham Independent College, Aston
Blackwater Academy, Newtown
Camp Hill Education, Camp Hill
Cannon Hill House, Moseley
City United Academy, Aston
Flexible Learning School, Hockley
Future First Independent School, Hockley
Green Heath School, Small Heath
Hopwood Hall School, Edgbaston
Imedia School, Erdington
Myles Academy, Soho
New Horizon Academy, Erdington
New Ways School, Kings Norton
Newbury Independent School, Aston
Orion School, Hockley
Oscott Academy, Erdington
Priory Woodbourne Hospital School, Edgbaston
Riverside Education, Stechford
RYAN Education Academy, Sparkbrook
St Paul's School, Balsall Heath
Silver Birch School, Shard End
Spring Hill High School, Erdington
TLG North Birmingham, Kingstanding
Values Academy, Hockley
VASE Academy, Handsworth

Further education
Edgbaston College
Queen Alexandra College

See also
Education in Birmingham

References

 
Birmingham
Schools